The Ranger 37, also called the Ranger 1 Ton, is an American sailboat, designed by Gary Mull as an International Offshore Rule one-ton racer and first built in 1972.

Production
The boat was built by Ranger Yachts in the United States and 100 examples were completed, starting in 1972. It is now out of production.

Design
The Ranger 37 is a small recreational keelboat, built predominantly of fiberglass. It has a masthead sloop rig, an internally-mounted rudder mounted on a skeg and a fixed fin keel. It displaces  and carries  of ballast.

The standard rig boat has a PHRF racing average handicap of 120 with a high of 120 and low of 120. There was the option of a taller rig that results in a PHRF racing average handicap of 123 with a high of 129 and low of 120.

See also
List of sailing boat types

References

Keelboats
1970s sailboat type designs
Sailing yachts
Sailboat type designs by Gary Mull
Sailboat types built by Ranger Yachts